Vomilenine is an alkaloid that is an intermediate chemical in the biosynthesis of ajmaline.

References

Tryptamine alkaloids
Quinolizidine alkaloids